Trozelia is a genus of flowering plants belonging to the family Solanaceae. It is also within the Physalinae (Miers) Hunz. subtribe.

It is native to Ecuador and Peru in western South America.

Known species
According to Kew:
 Trozelia grandiflora (Benth.) J.M.H.Shaw 
 Trozelia umbellata (Ruiz & Pav.) Raf. 

The genus name of Trozelia is in honour of Clas Blechert Trozelius (1719–1794), a Swedish clergyman and botanist. He was also professor of economics at Lund University. It was first described and published in Sylva Tellur. on page 54 in 1838.

References

Solanaceae
Solanaceae genera
Plants described in 1838
Flora of Ecuador
Flora of Peru